Charles-Joseph Sax (1 February 1790 – 26 April 1865) was a Belgian musical instrument maker. His son was Adolphe Sax, who invented the saxophone, the saxhorn and the saxotromba.

Sax was the son of Francoise Elisabeth (Maréchal) and Antoine Joseph Sax. He was a maker of wind and brass instruments, as well as of pianos, harps, and guitars. Sax was a great instrument maker, and made sure his son had a good education and a leg to stand on for his future. He was a careful, strict, and kind father to his son, Adolphe Sax, and played a big part in his son's successful career.

Instruments built by Charles-Joseph are held in some museum collections.

References

1790 births
1865 deaths
Walloon people
Belgian musical instrument makers